The Lowry Hill Tunnel is a tunnel  in length accommodating the Interstate 94 (I-94) freeway near downtown Minneapolis, Minnesota that was completed in late 1971. It is placed at a near-right-angle turn in the highway, forcing the three lanes of traffic in each direction to slow down.

Although constructed as a tunnel through rock, the surface a few yards above is covered with roadways. The tunnel functions as if it were the underpass under a  bridge which carries Hennepin Avenue, Lyndale Avenue, and various ramps over I-94.

Opened in November 1971, this tunnel was built with $31 million to help fix the congestion of 30,000 vehicles a day. Today, the Lowry Hill Tunnel sees an average of 185,000 vehicles pass through it each day, 54% more than the Lincoln Tunnel that connects New Jersey to Manhattan.

References

External links 

 Info about Minneapolis Interstate Highways

Tunnels in Minnesota
Transportation buildings and structures in Minneapolis
Interstate 94
Tunnels completed in 1971
Road tunnels in the United States